is a Japanese manga series written and illustrated by Mayu Shinjo. The manga was published by Shogakukan in Shōjo Comic between 1997 and 2000, and collected in 18 bound volumes. It was adapted as a 44-episode anime television series by Studio Hibari, and as a series of novels. The series tells the story of Aine Yukimura, a high school student who becomes the lyricist for a Japanese rock band, and her relationship with the band's lead singer, Sakuya Ookochi.

To promote the anime, a real-life band was formed: Λucifer, the band the story focuses on. The rival band, e.MU, seems to have been active before the manga was created. Both bands continued after the anime ended before disbanding. In the series, Λucifer's original name is Lucifer, changed to Λucifer (using the Greek letter lambda) when the band decides to go international. For the purposes of the article this second name, Λucifer, is used. Japanese names are given in Western order, with family name last.

Plot
Yukimura, Aine is a seventeen-year-old high school student who writes sensual song lyrics and hopes to become a songwriter. One day, two school friends talk her into entering her best lyrics into a contest. When someone bumps into her in the street, she drops her lyrics and is almost run over by a passing car. It is driven by Sakuya Ookochi, lead singer of the hard rock band Lucifer, which is known for its sensual lyrics. Aine does not know who he is but falls in love. He makes sure she is not hurt, and gives her an all-access pass to that night's show. After she leaves, he finds her lyrics and takes them back to the band with a plan in mind.

That night, Aine listens from the back of the audience. As she turns to leave, she hears Sakuya singing her lyrics. She runs to the stage to see if he is the driver of the car. She is swept off her feet. At first, people tell her Sakuya is never serious about women, and she thinks he might be toying with her. Later, he kidnaps her and convinces her to become the band's lyricist, and she thinks he is playing with her but for business reasons, not romance. Sakuya then transfers to Aine's high school, wanting to protect and work with her. Initially, he sees her as an innocent he can tease, but his feelings for her soon grow. Seeing her talent, and wanting to win the girl, Sakuya campaigns for Aine to become the band's official lyricist. His manager initially objects but relents upon seeing the continued excellence of Aine's lyrics. She becomes their lyricist, using the male pseudonym Yukihiko Aine to protect her identity and the band's image.

Aine and Sakuya's relationship gets off to a rocky start when they do not communicate their real feelings. Aine tries to hide her feelings for Sakuya, thinking he sees the two of them only as co-workers. She believes he wants to preserve her virginal imagination so that she will continue to write hit songs for the band. This seems confirmed when he rejects her advances. Although Sakuya is not subtle by nature, he attempts to express his feelings for her by writing a ballad called "Little Bird" or "Love Melody", but she continues to misunderstand. Finally, after filming the music video "Drug", he corners her and confesses his feelings.

But beginning a romance and being the girlfriend of a high-profile star is not easy. As the series progresses, Aine finds herself the frequent target of Sakuya's enemies, including rival bands and obsessed fans.

Ralph Grazer, Sakuya's older half-brother, is an American media mogul who heads a business empire in the United States and is branching into Asian markets. Ralph has a grudge against Sakuya, whom he has never met although their father has pushed them to make contact. Ralph goes to Japan and uses blackmail to force Aine to break up with Sakuya and work for him instead. Sakuya takes time out from the band to confront his biological father, the man had who had raped his mother. Sakuya travels to America to learn the family business, which gives him the knowledge and power to take Ralph's position as head of the media corporation. Sakuya returns to Japan and forces Ralph to sign a contract under which he will recover his position in return for releasing Aine. Ralph, used to getting whatever and whomever he wants, is confused by this tactic and by Sakuya's love for Aine. He returns to the United States to start over and relearn from their father. Ralph returns twice more in the manga, but no longer necessarily as Sakuya's enemy.

Lucifer continues to grow, becoming a major hit. Renamed Λucifer, the band prepares to tour America and Europe. Sakuya and Aine attempt to balance their love and professional lives. Aine's feelings for Sakuya and her ability to write lyrics are tested. The band hires Hitoshi Takayama as a producer to prepare for international fame. At first, Hitoshi thinks Aine is nothing more than an outspoken groupie, with no place on band premises or in Sakuya's life. But as he gets to know her he falls in love, hiding his feelings by pretending to be homosexual. As Hitoshi plans the band's six-month move to England to set the stage for capturing European fans, he attempts to break up both Sakuya and Aine's relationship and another couple, one of the band's guitarists, Atsuro, and his girlfriend Yuuka. Yuki, the band leader, and another guitarist, soon put a stop to this plan, letting Takayama know that band members owe their success to their families and lovers.

Kaito Yoshioka, president of a rival label, resents Λucifer's success. He decides to use Aine to break up the band and brutally rapes her in an attempt to break Sakuya. A guilt-ridden Hitoshi finds Aine and takes her to his home to try to comfort her, helping her avoid Sakuya out of shame, self-loathing, and fear of being rejected. When Aine tries to commit suicide that night, Takayama tells Sakuya. Devasted, Sakuya loses his voice along with the desire to sing and leaves the band. Yuki realizes that the only way to protect the entire band is to sign with Sakuya's half-brother Ralph's label, taking the band international. Meanwhile, Sakuya tries to kill Yoshioka, but Ralph stops him. He reminds Sakuya that Aine needs him to be with her, not in prison. Ralph avenges Aine by having Yoshioka investigated for tax evasion and fraud, which destroys his company.

Aine is in a near-catatonic state, and Sakuya takes her into hiding to care for her. When she again attempts suicide, he cuts his own wrist telling her he will die with her if that is what she really wants. Aine snaps out of her depression and begins to heal emotionally, even confronting and threatening Yoshioka to never bother Aucifer ever again. Takayama finds Sakuya, and with Yuki makes several attempts to persuade Sakuya to return to the band. Aine realizes that Sakuya is avoiding music and is afraid that she will be hurt again because of him. She convinces him to return to the world they both love. Takayama's death in a car accident traumatizes and pushes Sakuya to rejoin the band and sign the contract. Ralph tells Sakuya that, when he takes over from their father, he wants Sakuya to head the company's media business. Sakuya refuses, saying he would rather be a producer. After Takayama's death, Λucifer performs its final concert in Japan before moving to New York City. While they are overseas, Aine studies to take Takayama's place and become a producer. At the end of the series, Sakuya and Aine are married with a son. ~ See one-shot of Atsuro and Yuuka's wedding, and one-shot 'King Egoist' in Love Celeb for the announcement of Sakuya and Aine's second child ~

Characters

The main female protagonist of the series, Aine is a shy but innocent high school girl who does not know how to hide her feelings. Her home life is rocky, her parents seem to ignore her, and she is mostly left to her own devices. Hurt by this emotional neglect and lacking confidence in herself, she clings to and relies on Sakuya to protect and defend her and feels guilty about her inexperience and doubts. When Sakuya tells her parents that Aine will be living with him, they realize they are losing their daughter to a dangerous world. Sakuya eventually convinces Aine's father that he loves her and will protect her, so they can live together. Aine has to fight to find her own place within the record label, and prove herself repeatedly. She comes to be seen as important to Sakuya's emotional wellbeing and to the band and earns her place with her innovative concepts and her lyrics. Towards the series end, following her rape, recovery, and the death of her friend, band producer Hitoshi Takayama, she grows up, matures, and becomes stronger for herself, Sakuya and others.

The main character of the series, Sakuya is the highly talented lead singer of Λucifer. Seventeen and still in high school, he is also the band's youngest member. He transfers to Aine's high school to get closer to her.  While he respects and trusts Yuki, the only other band member he is close to is Atsuro. He is known for his striking blue eyes, inherited from his American father. Sakuya is also rude, physical, and does not care about life, even when he begins to sing with the band Lucifer. Sakuya has spent most of his young teenage years paying off his mother's debt at the club where she worked. Like his mother, he sang and played the piano for club guests. But to make more money, he also worked as a male escort prostitute on the side. He was able to do this because he appears older than his years. His harsh childhood experiences have caused Sakuya to lose trust in people. But when he meets high school girl Aine, he shows a new caring and sensitive attitude towards others, especially to Aine. When she first starts working for them he tells himself that he is selfishly using her, but before long his true feelings emerge. ~ See Sakuya's one-shot and Vol. 10, Lucifer's Legend. Sakuya also makes an appearance in "Love Celeb" as Kirara's producer.

Yuki is the leader of the band and one of its guitarists. He is the one who stands up to management for the best interests of Lucifer and his bandmates. In the anime only, Yuki is Santa's old friend and a co-founder of the band. He has the strongest sense of leadership and responsibility. In the manga, Yuki is the sole founder of Lucifer, who scouted Bi-Jazz band members Towa and Atsuro. ~ See one-shot on Towa and Vol. 10, Lucifer's Legend ~ It is often Yuki who knocks sense into Sakuya – sometimes almost too literally – when Sakuya's uncontrolled feelings blind him to Aine's hurt and pain, or his bandmates' exasperation. Yuki is the eldest son of a famous traditional Noh theater family, and must choose between the band and his family when he tells his father he wants to give up Noh and concentrate on the band. His father disowns him, but in a later episode of the anime series the two have a friendly relationship. In the manga, although he returns to Noh theater after Lucifer officially disbands, Yuki's relationship with his parents is not mentioned after Marriage Phrase, Vol. 6. Yuki is in an arranged marriage with Maria, also from a Noh theater family, and they have a child. Maria was in love with him but felt he treated her like a little sister. When eventually Maria finds out about Lucifer, she sneaks out with him to watch the band rehearse. Yuki's attitude changes when Sakuya makes advances to her. Maria supports his decision to be a guitarist in a band, but when Yuki's father disowns him he briefly divorces her, unsure of his ability to take care of a wife at that time. He begs her to remarry him when the band signs its first contract.

Λucifer's drummer Santa's nickname comes from his birth date, Christmas Day. Santa is easy-going but boisterous. In the anime only, along with his girlfriend Yumi he is a former member of the band Climb. He breaks up the band by leaving and joining Lucifer when Yumi cheats on him. Santa comes from a large family, loves ramen and beer, and has a tendency to put his foot in his mouth at the worst times. It is through Santa that Lucifer guitarist Yuki meets Sakuya. Other details of Santa's background are little known compared to his bandmates. He is the only one still single at the end of the series. In the manga (Vol. 10, Lucifer's Legend), Santa was the drummer in a heavy metal band called Shinigami. Yuki knocks him against a wall, angry to be taken for a woman, when Santa makes a pass at him when they first meet to discuss Santa joining Lucifer. Santa then agrees to a session.

Nicknamed "Towa", he is Λucifer's bass guitarist. He is enigmatic and does not joke around a lot. While he is not shy, he can be quiet and secretive. Towa and Atsuro are best friends from high school. They joined the band Bi-Jazz together. Much to his dislike, Towa's androgynous good looks mean not only women but also men swoon over him. His parents wanted a girl and so raised him as a girl for the first few years of his life. Cursed with fair, wavy hair and an effeminate beauty, and an inability to tan, Towa's looks blur gender perception boundaries so much that some people ignore his natural gender and do not consider him a man. His high school bane was receiving declarations of love from other boys, which Atsuro would tease him about. Although irked at first, Towa decides to use his beauty as a shield. The only person to whom he reveals his true self is his childhood friend and current girlfriend, Miya, who is Λucifer's official makeup artist. They grew up together and know each other so well he was afraid she would see him as a girlfriend not a man. Miya herself is something of a tomboy, and considers herself rather plain. She and Towa complement each other. Where she sees him as fully a man, he sees her as fully a woman.

Atsuro is one of Λucifer's two guitarists. As the band's friendliest and most cheerful member, he serves as the comic relief. Atsuro's long-time girlfriend, Yuuka, is actually his stepsister, and he desperately tries to keep their relationship a secret from their parents, the media, and even his bandmates. Their biggest obstacle is that they are registered as siblings, and so face the possibility that they cannot marry. Shinjo never fully explains the legal complications, even in the one-shot in which Atsuro and Yuuka get married in the United States without their parents' blessing. Aine is the first person to find out about Atsuro and Yuuka. She tells Atsuro she will keep their secret, even though the paparazzi see him with Aine and mistakenly report that Atsuro is having an affair with Sakuya's girlfriend. This causes Sakuya and Atsuro to fight, until Yuuka announces to the band that she is in love with Atsuro. The band members, except Sakuya, reveal that they had suspected this all along. By the end, Atsuro and Yuuka make a conscious decision to be together even if their parents object, and to be open about their relationship to the public.

Production
In her blog, Shinjo noted that though she was the actual creator of Sensual Phrase, she was one of the last to know that the series would be adapted into an anime, and that by the time she knew, Shogakukan had already made the decision to do the series. She was also unaware that there were talks about a film adaptation of the series until two years after the proposal was rejected. When the anime was rerun on AT-X, she learnt of this through the channel's official website. She left Shogakukan in 2007, despite the company's threat to take all of her earlier series, including Sensual Phrase, out of print if she did so. Shinjo contacted a lawyer, and the threat was never carried out.

Media

Manga

Written and illustrated by Mayu Shinjo, Sensual Phrase premiered in Shōjo Comic in 1997, where it was serialized monthly until its conclusion in 2000. The individual chapters were collected and published in 17 tankōbon volumes by Shogakukan from June 1997 through January 2001. An additional volume was released on April 24, 2003 containing a sequel chapter to the story and additional unrelated short stories. Shogakukan republished the serialized chapters across six shinsoban hard cover editions in 2003, and re-released the original 17 volumes in 2006 with new covers.

Sensual Phrase is licensed for English-language release in North America by Viz Media, including the special final volume. Viz Media published the first volume of the series on March 24, 2004; the final volume was released on February 13, 2007.

The series is licensed for regional language publication by Editorial Ivréa in Spain and Latin America, Pika Edition in France, Egmont Manga & Anime in Germany, and Star Comics in Italy.

Light novels
Five novels based on the manga were published by Shogakukan: 

 90-nichi no Densetsu, published December 1, 1999
 Hong Kong Kyoushikyoku, published July 25, 2000
 Ao no Meikyu, published November 26, 2001
 Owarinaki Shinwa, published February 2001
 Engage Song, published June 3, 2003

Anime
Sensual Phrase was adapted as an anime television series by Studio Hibari. It was directed by Hiroko Tokita, with music by Susumu Akitagawa and character designs by Yumi Nakayama. There were multiple opening and closing theme tunes, some of them credited to fictional bands Λucifer and e.MU, for which real-world counterparts were created. The anime was broadcast on TV Tokyo in 44 episodes from April 20, 1999 to March 25, 2000. It was later released on 11 videos by Pony Canyon.

Episode list

Soundtracks
 is the anime series soundtrack album. It was released on February 16, 2000 by Pony Canyon. Some tracks are performed by Λucifer, the real-world counterpart of the fictional rock band of the series.

Kaikan Phrase Visualism (or Kaikan Phrase BGM Image Album: VISUALISM) was released on March 15, 2000 by Pony Canyon. In addition, a self-titled album by Λucifer was released on April 15, 1998 by PolyGram, containing songs from the manga.

Video games
A video game based on the series, Kaikan Phrase: Datenshi Kourin, was released in Japan by Enix for the Sony PlayStation on February 24, 2000. Produced by Produce, it is a single-player music game featuring the five members of Λucifer.
In 2010, Datenshi no Amai Yuuwaku x Kaikan Phrase was released for the Nintendo DS.

On October 15, 2019, a mobile game titled Sensual Phrase Climax: Next Generation was launched for the iOS and Android.

Other
In 2006, a film adaption of Sensual Phrase was reportedly discussed by Shogakukan's Sensual Phrase editor, but the idea was rejected because the company felt the project would be too complicated. According to Shinjo, she was unaware of the proposal until several years later.

An artbook called SA KU YA and a postcard book based on the manga were also published.

References

External links
 Mayu Shinju's official Sensual Phrase page
 Official Viz Media Sensual Phrase site
 
 Band reunites

1997 manga
1999 anime television series debuts
Mayu Shinjo
Music in anime and manga
Romance anime and manga
Shogakukan manga
Shōjo manga
Studio Hibari
TV Tokyo original programming
Viz Media manga